Francisco Ramos de Castro (1890–1963) was a Spanish journalist, poet, playwright and screenwriter.

Selected filmography
 The Troublemaker (1950)
 The Troublemaker (1963)

References

Bibliography
 Vincent J. Cincotta. Zarzuela, the Spanish Lyric Theatre: A Complete Reference. University of Wollongong Press, 2002.

External links
 

1890 births
1963 deaths
20th-century Spanish male writers
Writers from Madrid
20th-century Spanish screenwriters